Iris ser. Laevigatae is a series of the genus Iris, in Iris subg. Limniris.

The series was first classified by Diels in 'Die Natürlichen Pflanzenfamilien' (Edited by H. G. A. Engler and K. Prantl) in 1930.
It was further expanded by Lawrence in  Gentes Herb (written in Dutch) in 1953.

This is a group of mainly moisture loving plants from Europe, Asia and North America. They generally need rich fertile soils, they can tolerate soils with a little lime. They generally flower between early and mid-summer. They have vigorous rhizomes and leaves. They can be easily cultivated in British gardens.  The leaves have small blackish spots along the veins. This can be seen when holding the leaf up to the light or under a microscope. This trait means that the species can tolerate moist soils.

They can also cross pollinate between species to create hybrids.

It includes:
Iris ensata Thunb. – Japanese iris, hanashōbu (Japanese) (including I. kaempferi)
Iris laevigata Fisch – rabbit-ear iris, shallow-flowered iris, kakitsubata (Japanese)
Iris maackii Maxim.
Iris pseudacorus L. – yellow iris, yellow flag
Iris versicolor L. – larger blue flag, harlequin blueflag
Iris virginica L. – Virginia iris

References

External links

Laevigatae
Flora of Europe
Flora of Asia
Flora of the United States